Informal social control, or the reactions of individuals and groups that bring about conformity to norms and laws, includes peer and community pressure, bystander intervention in a crime, and collective responses such as citizen patrol groups. The agents of the criminal justice system exercise more control when informal social control is weaker (Black, 1976). It is people who know each other informally controlling each other in subtle ways subconsciously.

See also
 Social control

Sources 

Control (social and political)